The Rashtriya Janshakti Party- Secular (Rashtriya Janshakti Party- Secular), is a political party in India. The RJP is led by party president Sanjay Siwal.

References

Political parties in India